The Botswana Democratic Party (abbr. BDP) is the governing party in Botswana. Its chairman is the Vice-President of Botswana, Slumber Tsogwane, and its symbol is a lift jack. The party has ruled Botswana continuously since gaining independence from the United Kingdom in 1966. The BDP is sometimes classified as a paternalistic conservative party and is also a consultative member of the Socialist International since 2014, which is a group including many worldwide social-democratic parties.

The BDP was primarily shaped by two of its founders, Sir Seretse Khama and Quett Ketumile Masire. Traditional Setswana communities make up the party's base, which has led the BDP to remain a conservative movement.

In the 2019 Parliamentary elections, the BDP took 38 seats, giving it continued control of the chamber.

History
In November 1961, Seretse Khama and other delegates to the African Advisory Council founded the party in Lobatse. Within the next few months Masire and Khama drafted a party constitution, and then held the party's first public meeting in Gaborone on 28 February 1962. Following the meeting the BDP was organized in the northern sections of the country by Seretse Khama, Amos Dambe, Archelaus Tsoebebe and James G. Haskins. The southern and western regions were primarily organized by the party secretary, Quett Masire. Masire also began publishing the party newspaper, Therisanyo/Consultation, in 1963, building on his past journalistic experiences. As a result of effective propaganda and organizing across the entire country, the BDP won a landslide in the 1965 election, taking 28 out of 31 seats. During the run-up to independence in 1966, Khama and Masire formed a formidable leadership team. Not only did they agree on major policy decisions, but they also identified and recruited talent into the party and government.

With Seretse Khama as President and Quett Masire as vice-president, Botswana prospered. Rapid economic growth and a peaceful, democratic society were the result.

For the next three decades, the BDP dominated the National Assembly, facing at most nine opposition MPs. Khama died in 1980, and was succeeded by his vice president, Quett Masire. His last term saw the BDP's dominance challenged for the first time, with opposition candidates winning 17 out of 44 seats.

Festus Mogae served as the country's president between 1998 and 2008. He was awarded the Grand Cross of the Légion d'honneur by French President Nicolas Sarkozy on 20 March 2008 for his "exemplary leadership" in making Botswana a "model" of democracy and good governance. Mogae won the 2008 Ibrahim Prize for Achievement in African Leadership.

Prior to the introduction of primary elections in 1998, the BDP leadership maintained a tight control over candidate selection and party financing. Since then, the primary system (known as "buleladitswe") combined with ongoing factional strife, has led to a loss of overall cohesion and increased competition for positions. Some, such as party founder Quett Masire, deplored this new development and believed that it had corrupted the party. Others have maintained that it modernized the party and brought in new political voices that could broaden its appeal in urban constituencies.

Ian Khama, the son of former president Sir Seretse Khama, joined the party ahead of the 1999 general elections. On 1 April 2008, Ian Khama ascended to the presidency as the fourth President of the Republic of Botswana, and relinquished his chairmanship of the Botswana Democratic Party. The vacant post was then undertaken by party stalwart and veteran Daniel Kwelagobe. Despite this development, Ian Khama moved to sideline Kwelagobe and other "Baratha-Phathi" factionalists in the government. In his inauguration address, Ian Khama outlined the National Vision 2016.

The party was ridden by factions in the 2000s, and observers predicted that unless discipline was instilled, the party would split. One faction (calling itself Barata-Phathi) was led by Ponatshego Kedikilwe and former Secretary General Daniel Kwelagobe, while the dominant faction (calling itself The A Team) was led by cabinet ministers Jacob Nkate and the late Mompati Merafhe. The A Team was formerly led by President Festus Mogae and Ian Khama (his vice president). Both of them have since pulled out from leading factions, and Khama eventually left the party in 2018, citing unfair treatment by his successor.

In May 2010, the BDP split, with the Botswana Movement for Democracy formed, led by Botsalo Ntuane and the other Parliament ministers who opposed President Khama's political decisions.

The 2014 election resulted in the BDP taking 37 parliamentary seats, a decreased margin from the previous election in 2009, but still a majority in the 63-seat chamber and 20 seats more than the next largest party. As a result, President Khama retained his position as president for a second five-year term.

The current chairman of the Botswana Democratic Party is Slumber Tsogwane.

On November 1, 2019, Duma Boko, who led Botswana's coalition Umbrella for Democratic Change in the 2019 Botswana general election, charges there were "massive electoral discrepancies" and wants to challenge the election in court. Official results show the BDP winning 38 of 57 constituencies.

Electoral history

National Assembly elections

Notable members 
 Gaositwe K.T. Chiepe
 Ponatshego Kedikilwe
 Mompati Merafhe
 Sir Seretse Khama
 Sir Quett Masire
 Phandu Skelemani
 Pelonomi Venson-Moitoi
 Festus Mogae
 Neo Moroka
 Daniel Kwelagobe
 Mokgweetsi Masisi
 Slumber Tsogwane

References

External links
Official website

Political parties established in 1961
Political parties in Botswana
Consultative member parties of the Socialist International